Menahem Pressler (born 16 December 1923) is a German-born Israeli-American pianist.

Pressler is Jewish. Following Kristallnacht, he and his immediate family fled Nazi Germany in 1939, initially to Italy, and then to Palestine.  His grandparents, uncles, aunts and cousins all died in concentration camps.  His career was launched after he won first prize at the Debussy International Piano Competition in San Francisco in 1946. His Carnegie Hall debut subsequently followed, with the Philadelphia Orchestra conducted by Eugene Ormandy.  

Since 1955, Pressler has taught on the piano faculty at the Indiana University Jacobs School of Music, where he holds the rank of Distinguished Professor of Music as the Charles Webb Chair.  His debut as a chamber musician was at the 1955 Berkshire Festival, where he appeared as the pianist of the Beaux Arts Trio, with Daniel Guilet, violin, and Bernard Greenhouse, cello.  Although he was a junior partner in the Beaux Arts Trio at the outset, Pressler was the only original member of the trio to perform with the group through its entire existence, including several changes of membership, up to the dissolution of the trio in 2008.  In 2010, he played at the Rheingau Musik Festival with Antônio Meneses, the last cellist of the Beaux Arts Trio, and appeared before in the series Rendezvous.

Pressler returned to Germany in 2008 on the occasion of the 70th anniversary of Kristallnacht.  In January 2014, aged 90, he made his debut with the Berlin Philharmonic. His performance with the Berlin Philharmonic and Sir Simon Rattle at their 2014 New Year's Eve Concert was televised live throughout the world.

The Beaux Arts Trio made an extensive series of recordings for Philips.  In addition, Pressler has recorded solo piano music commercially on the La Dolce Volta label and Deutsche Grammophon in 2018 a recording of French music dedicated to his constant companion Annabelle Whitestone, Lady Weidenfeld. Already at the beginning of the 1950s he had recorded a substantial quantity of solo piano music and for piano and orchestra of various composers for the American label MGM.

Awards and recognition 
Among his honors and awards, Pressler has received honorary doctorates from the University of Nebraska, the San Francisco Conservatory of Music and the North Carolina School of the Arts, six Grammy nominations (including one in 2006), a lifetime achievement award from Gramophone magazine and the International Classical Music Awards, Chamber Music America’s Distinguished Service Award, the Gold Medal of Merit from the National Society of Arts and Letters. He has also been awarded the German Critics “Ehrenurkunde” award and election into the American Academy of Arts and Sciences. In 2007 Pressler was appointed as an Honorary Fellow of the Jerusalem Academy of Music and Dance in recognition of a lifetime of performance and leadership in music. In 2005 Pressler received two additional awards of international merit: the German Bundesverdienstkreuz (Cross of Merit), Germany’s highest honor, and France’s highest cultural honor, the Commandeur in the Order of Arts and Letters award. In 2015 he received an Honorary Doctorate from the Royal Academy of Music London, Hon RAM, and received the lifetime Achievement Award from ECHO Classic in Germany. In 2016 he was given the Lifetime Achievement Award from Les Victoires de la Musique Classique in France. In December 2017 he received an Honorary Doctorate from Ben Gurion University in Beer Sheba Israel.

References

External links
Menahem Pressler's site
Indiana University Alliance of Distinguished and Titled Professors - Menahem Pressler
Interview with Menahem Pressler, 8 June 1996

1923 births
Living people
German classical pianists
Male classical pianists
Jewish emigrants from Nazi Germany to Mandatory Palestine
Jacobs School of Music faculty
Jewish classical pianists
Officers Crosses of the Order of Merit of the Federal Republic of Germany
Commanders of the Ordre national du Mérite
Commandeurs of the Ordre des Arts et des Lettres
21st-century classical pianists
Beaux Arts Trio members
Israeli emigrants to the United States
21st-century male musicians
Cedille Records artists